Shaltukabad (also Romanized as Shaltūkābād; also known as Shaltūkābād-e Gonbagī) is a village in Gonbaki Rural District, Gonbaki District, Rigan County, Kerman Province, Iran. At the 2006 census, its population was 828, in 200 families.

References 

Populated places in Rigan County